This is a list of prominent historical Pennsylvania women:

Mary Ambler (1805–1868)
Marian Anderson (1897–1993)/
Nellie Bly (1864–1922)
Pearl S. Buck
Rachel Carson (1907–1964)
Margaret Corbin (1754–1800)
Henrietta Crosman
Isabel Darlington (1865–1950)
Lydia Darragh (1728–1789)
Saint Katherine Drexel
Eliza Clayland Tomlinson Foster
Hannah Freeman
Martha Glaser
Elsie Hillman
Emma Hunter
Rebecca Lukens (1794–1854)
Sophie Masloff
Sybilla Masters (1676–1720)
Lucy Kennedy Miller (1880-1962)
Evelyn Foster Morneweck
Lucretia Mott (1793–1880)
Mary Engle Pennington (1872–1952)
Ann Preston (1813–1872)
Jennie Bradley Roessing
Betsy Ross
Marion Margery Scranton (1884–1960)
Florence Seibert (1897–1991)
Frances Slocum (1773–1847)
Amanda Berry Smith (1837–1915)
Anna Bustill Smith (1862-1945)
Eliza Kennedy Smith (1889-1964)
Ida Tarbell (1857–1944)
Martha Gibbons Thomas (1869–1942)
Elizabeth Thorn (1832–1907)
Laurie Trok
Marion Foster Welch
Jane McDowell Foster Wiley

See also 

 List of Pennsylvania suffragists

References

 
American inventors
Women inventors
History of Pittsburgh